The Journal of Public Relations Research  is a peer-reviewed academic journal on public relations published quarterly by Taylor and Francis for the Public Relations Division of the Association for Education in Journalism and Mass Communication. The editor-in-chief is Bey-Ling Sha (San Diego State University). The journal was established in 1989.

External links
 

Publications established in 1989
Quarterly journals
Business and management journals
English-language journals
Taylor & Francis academic journals